Mauritiella pumila is a species of flowering plant in the family Arecaceae. It is found in Colombia and Venezuela.

References

Trees of Venezuela
Trees of Colombia
Calamoideae